The Chensagi River East is a tributary of the Chensagi River in Regional County Municipality (RCM) of Eeyou Istchee Baie-James (municipality), in the administrative region of Nord-du-Québec, in the Canadian province of Quebec, in Canada.

The East Chensagi River hydrographic slope is served by the secondary northbound road from Matagami passing at  West of the mouth of the East Chensagi River. Another forest road from the South spans the Maicasagi River, then cross the East Chensagi River. The surface of the river is usually frozen from early November to mid-May, however, safe ice circulation is generally from mid-November to mid-April.

Geography 
The main hydrographic slopes near the Chensagi River East are:
North side: Chensagi River, Amisquioumisca Lake, Nipukatasi River, Rocher lake;
East side: Maicasagi River, Moquachéa Lake;
South side: Yapuouichi Lake, Maicasagi River;
West side: Chensagi River, Chensagi Lake, Poncheville Lake.

The Chensagi River originates at the mouth of a small unidentified lake.

The mouth of this head lake is located at:
 North of the mouth of the East Chensagi River
 Northeast of the mouth of the Chensagi River (confluence with Maicasagi Lake);
 Northeast of Goéland Lake (Waswanipi River);
 North of the mouth of the Matagami Lake;
 Southeast of the mouth of the Nottaway River);
 Northeast of downtown Matagami.

From its source, the "Chensagi River East" flows over  according to the following segments:
 West, to a creek (coming from the South);
 North to a stream (coming from the East);
 North to a creek (coming from the East);
 North, then West, through marsh areas, to a stream (from the Northeast);
 West through marsh areas to its mouth.

The "Chensagi River East" empties on the East bank of the Chensagi River which generally flows Southwestward across Chensagi Lake to a bay in the northwest of Maicasagi Lake. The latter in turn flows southwesterly through the Max Passage into the Goéland Lake, which is crossed to the northwest by the Waswanipi River.

The mouth of the Chensagi River East is located at:
 North of the mouth of the Chensagi River;
 Northeast of the mouth of Maicasagi Lake;
 Northeast of the mouth of Goéland Lake (Waswanipi River);
 Northeast of the mouth of Olga Lake (Waswanipi River);
 Northwest of the village center of Waswanipi;
 Northeast of downtown Matagami.

Toponymy 
The toponym "rivière Chensagi" was formalized on December 5, 1968, at the Commission de toponymie du Québec, i.e. at the creation of this commission

References

See also 

Rivers of Nord-du-Québec
Nottaway River drainage basin
Eeyou Istchee James Bay